The 1980 United States presidential election in New Mexico took place on November 4, 1980. All 50 states and The District of Columbia, were part of the 1980 United States presidential election. State voters chose four electors to the Electoral College, who voted for president and vice president.

New Mexico was won by former California Governor Ronald Reagan by an 18-point landslide. 
President of the United States Jimmy Carter failed to gain reelection against Reagan. New Mexico election results reflect the Republican Party's re-consolidation under what is popularly called the "Reagan Revolution," which sounded overwhelming conservative electoral victories across the United States. , this is the last time when McKinley County and Grant County voted for a Republican presidential candidate.

Results

Results by county

References

1980 New Mexico elections
1980
New Mexico